Abdullahi Kuso (born February 17, 1984) is a Nigerian former professional basketball player who last played for Ibaraki Robots in Japan.

Career statistics 

|-
| align="left" |  2010-11
| align="left" | Ryukyu
|26 || 7||17.3 || .572||.000 ||.582 ||7.7 ||0.6 ||0.8 ||1.0 ||8.7
|-
| align="left" |  2010-11
| align="left" | Fukuoka
| 18|| 18||11.1 ||.531 || ||.638 ||9.2 ||1.1 ||0.7 ||0.6 ||11.1
|-
| align="left" |  2012-13
| align="left" | Miyazaki
| 31|| 23|| 32.7|| .458|| .000|| .643|| 12.3|| 2.1|| 0.7|| 1.5||  17.3
|-
| align="left" | 2013-14
| align="left" | Aomori
| 52||49 || 24.1|| .469|| .000|| .635|| 10.5|| 1.3|| 1.0|| 1.4||  10.2
|-
| align="left" |  2014-15
| align="left" | Iwate
| 52|| 0|| 15.8|| .502|| ---|| .682|| 6.0|| 0.5|| 0.8|| 0.9|| 6.4
|-
| align="left" |  2015-16
| align="left" | Iwate
| 52 || 50 ||29.5  || .501 ||1.000  ||.691  || 11.0 || 1.8 ||1.6  ||1.5  ||  12.7
|-
| align="left" |  2016-17
| align="left" | Gunma
| 60 ||60  ||22.8  || .514 || .000 || .679 || 8.7 ||1.4  ||0.8  ||1.8  || 13.0
|-
| align="left" | 2017-18
| align="left" | Kagawa
| 60|| 2 ||14.7  || .472 ||.000  ||.719  ||5.2  || 1.0 ||0.8  || 1.1 ||7.7

|-
|}

References

1984 births
Living people
African Games gold medalists for Nigeria
African Games medalists in basketball
African Games bronze medalists for Nigeria
Aomori Wat's players
Competitors at the 2007 All-Africa Games
Competitors at the 2011 All-Africa Games
Gonzaga Bulldogs men's basketball players
Gunma Crane Thunders players
Halifax Hurricanes players
Iwate Big Bulls players
Junior college men's basketball players in the United States
Kagawa Five Arrows players
KK Zadar players
Miyazaki Shining Suns players
Rizing Zephyr Fukuoka players
Ryukyu Golden Kings players
Tallahassee Eagles men's basketball players
Ulsan Hyundai Mobis Phoebus players
Sportspeople from Kaduna